Percy Bradley (25 August 1887 – 1967) was an English professional footballer who played as a goalkeeper.

References

1887 births
1967 deaths
Footballers from Kingston upon Hull
English footballers
Association football goalkeepers
Grimsby Town F.C. players
Goole Town F.C. players
Gainsborough Trinity F.C. players
English Football League players